Sadako and the Thousand Paper Cranes is a children's historical novel written by Canadian-American author Eleanor Coerr and published in 1977. It is based on the story of Sadako Sasaki.

The book has been translated into many languages and published in many places, to be used for peace education programs in primary schools.

Plot overview
After being diagnosed with leukemia from radiation caused by the atomic bombing of Hiroshima, Sadako's friend told her to fold origami paper cranes (orizuru) in hope of making a thousand of them. She was inspired to do so by the Japanese legend that one who created a thousand origami cranes would be granted a wish. Her wish was simply to live through her disease so she could fulfill her dream of being on the running team. In this retelling of her story, she managed to fold only 644 cranes before she became too weak to fold any more, and died in her sleep on the morning of October 25, 1955, knowing her family will always be there. Her friends and family helped finish her dream by folding the rest of the cranes, which were buried with Sadako.

Sadako's story
The claim in Coerr's book that Sadako "died before completing the 1000 cranes, and her two friends completed the task, placing the finished cranes in her casket" is not backed up by her surviving family members. According to her family, and especially her older brother Masahiro Sasaki, who speaks on his sister's life at events, Sadako not only exceeded 644 cranes, she exceeded her goal of 1,000 and died having folded approximately 1,450 paper cranes. In his book, The Complete Story of Sadako Sasaki, co-written with Sue DiCicco, founder of the Peace Crane Project, Masahiro says Sadako exceeded her goal.

Sasaki and the family have donated some of Sadako's cranes at places of importance around the world: in NYC at the National September 11 Memorial & Museum, at Pearl Harbor, Hawaii, at the Harry S. Truman Presidential Library and Museum on November 19, 2015, at Museum of Tolerance on May 26, 2016, and the Japanese American National Museum three days later. USS Arizona Memorial Crane Donation and President Truman Museum Donation helped by Clifton Truman Daniel, who is the grandson of President Truman.

After her death, Sadako's friends and schoolmates published a collection of letters in order to build a memorial to her and all of the children who had died from the effects of the atomic bomb. In 1999, a statue of Sadako holding a ruby crane was unveiled in the Hiroshima Peace Memorial, also called the Genbaku Dome, and installed in the Hiroshima Peace Park.

At the foot of the statue is a plaque that reads: "This is our cry. This is our prayer. Peace on Earth." Every year during the Obon holiday, which is a holiday in Japan to remember the departed spirits of one's ancestors, thousands of people leave paper cranes near the statue. A paper crane database has been established online for contributors to leave a message of peace and to keep a record of those who have donated cranes.

Related works
In addition to Eleanor Coerr's story first published in 1977, Sadako's story has become familiar to many school children around the world through the novels The Day of the Bomb (1961, in German, Sadako will leben) by the Austrian writer Karl Bruckner. Sadako is also briefly mentioned in Children of the Ashes, Robert Jungk's historical account of the lives of Hiroshima victims and survivors and about Japan World War II.

Masahiro Sasaki, Sadako's older brother, co-wrote The Complete Story of Sadako Sasaki with The Peace Crane Project founder Sue DiCicco in 2018, bringing what he feels is Sadako's complete story to the English speaking world for the first time. The book contains many family photos and new illustrations never before seen by the public. Masahiro also wrote 'Sadako's One Thousand Paper Cranes', published in Japanese in 2013.

"Sadako and the Thousand Paper Cranes", a movie by Director George Levenson and based on the book by Eleanor Coerr (book), and written by George Levenson, starring Liv Ullmann as narrator was released in 1991.

Evolving Pictures Entertainment is producing a motion picture tentatively entitled Sadako and the Magic of Paper Cranes, focuses on a true story written by three-time Academy Award winning producer, director, documentarian Malcolm Clarke about chronicling a group of fifth grade students from Albuquerque, New Mexico when inspired by their teacher, make their dream of building a monument come true, to honor the legend and spirit of the young girl Sadako Sasaki. In 2019, a motion picture titled One Thousand Paper Cranes was announced to begin production with Evan Rachel Wood playing Eleanor Coerr, telling the story of Coerr and Sadako and "how their lives are intricately connected."

There is also a statue of Sadako in the Seattle Peace Park. In addition, Sadako's story was dramatized at the opening ceremony of the Goodwill Games 1990 in Seattle when, to Ellie Rabb's narration of Sadako's story, some 400 local schoolchildren handed out some 20,000 origami paper cranes to the opening day crowd, thereby honoring the memory of Sadako and spreading her unfulfilled dream for world peace. The Seattle souvenir cranes were supposedly crafted from an original 1,000 pieces sent over by children from Japan.

Sadako has become a leading symbol of peace that is taught in Japanese schools on the anniversary of the Hiroshima bombing. In dedication to her, people all over the world celebrate August 6, as the annual Peace Day.

In November 2015, Miyuki Sohara made "Orizuru 2015", an educational short film for children. This film is a friendship story and made with Los Angeles School kids, Hollywood actors and crews. Sadako's nephew appears in film and sings a song about Sadako's life, "Inori".
This film was selected by Hiroshima International Film Festival in 2015 and afterward was released in Los Angeles on May 27, 2016, at its US premiere screening. This date coincided with President Obama's visit to Hiroshima with a gift for four paper cranes. At the same time, Miyuki Sohara coordinated Sadako's two crane donations to the Museum of Tolerance and the Japanese American National Museum. She also coordinated a lecture promoting peace with Sasaki and Clifton Truman Daniel, grandson of President Truman, to several schools in Southern California.

Laurie Rubin and Jenny Taira, Co-founders and Artistic Directors of Ohana Arts, a children's theater and arts organization based in Honolulu, Hawai'i, have written a musical for youth performers called "Peace on Your Wings", based on the life of Sadako Sasaki and her message of hope and peace for the world. The musical has been performed across the United States and has the support and approval of members of Sadako's surviving family. The Bell Shakespeare theatre company in Sydney, Australia mounted a production of Sadako and the Thousand Paper Cranes during its 1997 season.

The album Wanderer by the death metal/metalcore band Heaven Shall Burn features a song called "Passage of the Crane" dedicated to her story, as does "Sadako's Wings of Hope" on Niobeth's album Silvery Moonbeams.

The 2020 album Sadako e le mille gru di carta by Italian progressive rock band LogoS is a tribute to Sadako's legacy and was released on the 75th anniversary of the Hiroshima bombing.

See also

 Children's Peace Monument
 Hiroshima Witness
 Peace Park (Seattle)
 Orizuru

References

1977 American novels
1977 children's books
American children's novels
Novels about the atomic bombings of Hiroshima and Nagasaki
Children's historical novels
Novels about cancer
Fiction about origami
Japan in non-Japanese culture
G. P. Putnam's Sons books